Tmesisternus divisus is a species of beetle in the family Cerambycidae. It was described by Per Olof Christopher Aurivillius in 1927. It is known from Papua New Guinea.

References

divisus
Beetles described in 1927